The North Staffordshire Railway (NSR) had a number of halts and non-public timetable stations.  Halts were small, unstaffed stations with few, if any, facilities. Non-public timetable stations were stations that did not feature in the publicly advertised railway timetable and were, for example, for internal railway use only or only served by excursion trains rather than regular services.

Many of the NSR halts opened in the early 20th century when the NSR introduced railmotor services in an attempt to rival the bus and tram services that were developing in Stoke-on-Trent.

References
Notes

Sources
 
 
 
 
North Staffordshire Railway
Former North Staffordshire Railway stations